Eric Kirby (12 October 1926 - May 2018) was an English professional footballer who played as a half-back in the Football League for York City, and was on the books of Sheffield Wednesday without making a league appearance.

References

1926 births
2018 deaths
Footballers from Sheffield
English footballers
Association football midfielders
Sheffield Wednesday F.C. players
York City F.C. players
English Football League players